J. Steven Dowd is an American businessman who currently serves as the United States Director of the European Bank for Reconstruction and Development (EBRD). Prior to assuming his current role, he was United States Director of the African Development Bank. Previous to his government service, Dowd co-founded Ag Source, LLC, a global logistics, trading, and finance company. He has overseen food aid operations and port infrastructure projects, and served as CEO of Marcona Ocean Industries, an international shipping and mining company.

Mr. Dowd was nominated by the President of the United States to serve as United States Executive Director of the European Bank for Reconstruction and Development. He was confirmed for EBRD by the United States Senate in July 2020 where he is currently posted.

References

External links
 J. Steven Dowd on C-SPAN
https://m.youtube.com/watch?v=Fg14L2aNC-o
Twitter
htt  Year of birth missing (living people)
 ps://www.foreign.senate.gov/imo/media/doc/060420_Dowd_Testimony.pdf

Living people
Manhattan College alumni
Georgetown University alumni
Businesspeople from Florida
American chief executives
Trump administration personnel